Kornelia Grosicka (born 23 June 1999) is a Polish professional footballer who plays as a midfielder.

Career
She has played 149 matches scoring 37 goals in the Ekstraliga. She started her career at Błękitni Stargard in 2011, winning promotion to the top flight in 2016, aged 17, in an unbeated season for the club. Grosicka moved to Olimpia Szczecin in 2017, becoming a leading player at the club.

Style of play
Grosicka is predominantly right-footed, and her greatest attributes are said to be pace and shot power. She is said to have started playing at a young age, and that her long terms plans are to be selected for the national team and to play for a leading foreign club.

Personal life
She is the sister of the Polish international Kamil Grosicki.

References

1999 births
Living people
Polish women's footballers
Women's association football midfielders